Taylor Thomas Lindsey (born December 2, 1991) is a professional baseball player who is currently a free agent.

Career

Los Angeles Angels
Lindsey was drafted 37th overall by the Los Angeles Angels of Anaheim in the 2010 Major League Baseball Draft, out of Desert Mountain High School. Prior to the 2014 season, Baseball America rated Lindsey the 93rd best prospect in baseball.

San Diego Padres
On July 19, 2014, Lindsey was traded to the San Diego Padres with José Rondón, R. J. Alvarez, and Elliot Morris in exchange for Huston Street and Trevor Gott. On November 20, 2014, the Padres added Lindsey to their 40-man roster to protect him from the Rule 5 Draft. Lindsey was designated for assignment on August 11, 2015. He elected free agency on November 7, 2016.

Laredo Lemurs
On April 20, 2017, Lindsey signed with the Laredo Lemurs of the American Association of Independent Professional Baseball. He became a free agent on May 9, 2017, when the Lemurs folded.

References

External links

 Angels prospect Lindsey already a big hit
 Angels' Lindsey boasts immense offensive potential

1991 births
Living people
Baseball players from Scottsdale, Arizona
Arizona League Angels players
Orem Owlz players
Inland Empire 66ers of San Bernardino players
Arkansas Travelers players
Mesa Solar Sox players
Salt Lake Bees players
El Paso Chihuahuas players